Framingham Airport was an airfield operational in the early-20th century in Framingham, Massachusetts, replacing an earlier airport in town. It later became the location of the Framingham Assembly in 1947.

References

Defunct airports in Massachusetts
Airports in Worcester County, Massachusetts
Framingham, Massachusetts